Eupithecia paryphata is a moth in the  family Geometridae. It is found in Bolivia.

References

Moths described in 1908
paryphata
Moths of South America